Ira Edward "Shorty" Ransom (November 9, 1898 – May 23, 1959) was an American football coach and college athletics administrator.  He served two stints as the head football coach at Daniel Baker College in Brownwood, Texas, from 1925 to 1927 and 1938 to 1940, compiling a record of 18–39–4.  His 1926 Daniel Baker team won the Texas Intercollegiate Athletic Association (TIAA) championship.

Ransom played college football as a quarterback at Marietta College in Marietta, Ohio.  He coached at Comanche High School in Comanche, Texas before first coming to Daniel Baker in 1925.  In between his two stints at the Brownwood school, Ransom worked in bridge construction and the oil business.  He returned to Daniel Baker in 1938 as head football coach and athletic director.

Ransom was a pilot during World War I and a flying instructor during World War II.  He later worked in the instrument department at Dow Chemical Company.  He died on May 23, 1959.

Head coaching record

References

External links
 

1898 births
1959 deaths
American football quarterbacks
Daniel Baker Hillbillies athletic directors
Daniel Baker Hillbillies football coaches
Marietta Pioneers football players
High school football coaches in Texas
American World War I pilots
Dow Chemical Company employees
People from Butler County, Pennsylvania